Nylanderia vagabunda, is a species of Formicinae ant found in Sri Lanka.

External links

 at antwiki.org

Formicinae
Hymenoptera of Asia
Insects described in 1863